Marlin Adarryl Barnes (April 6, 1974 – April 13, 1996) was a linebacker for the University of Miami. He was found shot and beaten to death in his apartment in 1996, along with his longtime friend, Timwanika Lumpkins. Barnes was a six-foot, 220-pound linebacker who played second string for the Hurricanes.  Barnes and former Baltimore Ravens linebacker Ray Lewis were roommates at the University of Miami.

Murder
On the morning of April 13, 1996, Barnes' body was discovered when his roommate Earl Little came home to pick up the keys to his truck. Little found that someone had slashed two of the tires on his truck, and when he attempted to open the door to the apartment, he noticed that there was something obstructing the door. When Earl looked through an opening in the door, he saw the Barnes' body slumped against the door with a pool of blood surrounding him. Barnes was severely injured and had nearly lost his entire face in what appeared to be a brutal beating, and was close to death when Little found him. By the time the police arrived, Barnes was already dead. It was discovered that Barnes had been beaten to death with a blunt object. After a thorough search of the rest of the apartment, police found the beaten and broken, yet alive, body of Barnes’ girlfriend, Timwanika Lumpkins, pinned between the bed and the wall. She later died in the hospital.

Investigation
After seventeen days of investigation, it was concluded that Lumpkins’ ex-boyfriend,  Labrant Dennis, had entered the apartment after slashing the tires on Little's car. After entering the apartment, Dennis proceeded to beat Barnes twenty-two times with the butt of a shotgun. When he was done with Barnes, he turned on Lumpkins, doing the same to her as he did to Barnes. Dennis was sentenced to the death penalty and, was still on death row.

Aftermath
In December 1996, the University of Miami agreed to a financial settlement with the families of Barnes and Lumpkins due to the murders having occurred in an on-campus apartment.  All parties agreed to maintain the confidentiality of the settlement terms. But the Miami Herald reported that each family received more than $1 million.

In popular culture
In 2003 the popular Discovery Channel documentary series The New Detectives covered the case in the episode named "Crimes of Passion" (S08E10) with the similar murder case of Ralph Gawor from Fresno, California.

The Investigation Discovery documentary series The Perfect Murder, in an episode titled "The Last Blitz"' , air date: September 27, 2018, run time: 42 minutes, depicts the Barnes-Lumpkins murders and the shock waves experienced by the University of Miami campus and community.

References

External links
U. S. District Court Southern District of Florida: Labrant D. Dennis vs. Florida Department of Corrections - Petition for Writ of Habeas Corpus (dated: December 3, 2015)

Miami Hurricanes football players
1996 deaths
1996 murders in the United States
1974 births
Players of American football from Florida
American murder victims
Male murder victims
People murdered in Florida
Deaths by firearm in Florida
Deaths by beating in the United States